Robert Constable (c. 1478 – 1537) was an English nobleman during the Tudor period.

Robert Constable may also refer to:

Robert Constable (14th century MP), for Yorkshire (UK Parliament constituency) in 1388
Robert Constable (died 1558), for Yorkshire in 1553
Robert Constable (died 1591), MP for Nottinghamshire and Nottingham
Robert Constable (fl. 1586), MP in 1586 for Appleby (UK Parliament constituency)
Robert L. Constable (born 1942), American professor of computer science
Bob Constable (footballer) (born 1932), Australian footballer for Melbourne